John Campbell-Renton (22 April 1814 – 25 February 1856) was a British Conservative politician.

The son of Robert Campbell and Susanna (née Renton), Campbell-Renton was elected Conservative MP for Berwick-upon-Tweed at the 1847 general election but lost the seat at the next election in 1852. He attempted to regain the seat at a by-election in 1853—caused by the 1852 election being declared void on account of bribery—but was unsuccessful.

References

External links
 

UK MPs 1859–1865
1814 births
1856 deaths
Conservative Party (UK) MPs for English constituencies